Indianapolis Metropolitan High School, known as "Indy Met" for short, is a public charter high school in Indianapolis, Indiana, United States. Indy Met currently enrolls students from grades nine through twelve. It was established on August 24, 2004, by Goodwill Education Initiatives.

Demographics
Of Indy Met's 343 students (2007-08 school year), 66% are black, 28% are white, 1% are Hispanic, 1% are Native American, and 3% are multiracial.  52% of students qualify for free lunches and 10% qualify for reduced price lunches.

See also
 List of high schools in Indiana

References

External links
 School Homepage
 IMHS Snapshot

Schools in Indianapolis
Public high schools in Indiana
IHSAA Conference-Independent Schools
Charter schools in Indiana